Sydney Jackman (born 8 March 1945) is a Guyanese cricketer. He played in four first-class matches for British Guiana in 1965/66.

See also
 List of Guyanese representative cricketers

References

External links
 

1945 births
Living people
Guyanese cricketers
Guyana cricketers